HTV News may refer to:

 The West Tonight, British news broadcast formerly called HTV News
 Wales at Six, Welsh news broadcast called HTV News from 1999 to 2004
 News bulletins on HTV Group stations in Wales and the West of England
 Croatian_Radiotelevision#Television (Croatian: Hrvatska televizija)

See also
 HTV (disambiguation)